Kay Ellen Ivey (born October 15, 1944) is an American politician serving as the 54th and incumbent governor of Alabama since 2017. Originally a conservative Southern Democrat, Ivey became a member of the Republican Party in 2002. She was the 38th Alabama state treasurer from 2003 to 2011 and the 30th lieutenant governor of Alabama from 2011 to 2017.

Ivey became Alabama's second female governor and the first female Republican governor upon the resignation of her predecessor, Robert J. Bentley. She won a full term in the 2018 gubernatorial election by a wide margin against challenger Walt Maddox and was reelected by an even wider margin against Yolanda Flowers in the 2022 gubernatorial election. At age , Ivey is the oldest currently serving governor in the United States.

Early life and education
Ivey was born on October 15, 1944, in Camden, Alabama, as the only child to Boadman Nettles (1913–1997) and Barbara Elizabeth (née Nettles) Ivey (1915–1998). Her father, who served as an officer in the U.S. Army during World War II, worked with the Gees Bend community as part of the Farmers Home Administration. Ivey's parents were second cousins.

Growing up in Camden, Ivey worked on her father's farm. She graduated from Auburn University, where she was a member of Alpha Gamma Delta, becoming president of her first-year pledge class, and served in the Student Government Association all four years. Ivey participated in a blackface skit while at Auburn, for which she later apologized. In 2021, Ivey received an honorary Doctor of Letters from Jacksonville State University.

In 1967, Ivey moved to California following a marriage and became a high school teacher for several years. Following the end of her marriage, she returned to Alabama and landed a position with Merchants National Bank, where she launched a school relations program to promote financial literacy. Ivey has been divorced twice and has no children.

Entry into politics

In 1979, she was appointed by then-Governor Fob James to serve in the state cabinet. She later served as the reading clerk of the Alabama House of Representatives between 1980 and 1982 and served as Assistant Director of the Alabama Development Office between 1982 and 1985.

In 1982, Ivey ran unsuccessfully for State Auditor as a Democrat. She was Director of Government Affairs and Communications for the Alabama Commission on Higher Education from 1985 until 1998.

State Treasurer (2003–2011)

Ivey took office as state treasurer in 2003, after defeating Stephen Black, the grandson of former United States Supreme Court justice Hugo Black, in the 2002 general election, by a margin of 52–48%. In 2006, Ivey was reelected over Democrat Steve Segrest by a 60–40% margin. She was the first Republican elected state treasurer since Reconstruction.

As Treasurer, Ivey also oversaw the near complete financial collapse of the Prepaid Affordable College Tuition (PACT) program.  Under this program tens of thousands of Alabama families were assured by the state that their investment in the program would guarantee their children four years of tuition at any state college. Following the program's inception, many of the state's colleges increased the cost of tuition at triple the inflation rate (or more), so the program became financially unsustainable and was subsequently bailed out by the Alabama state legislature.

Lieutenant Governor (2011–2017)

Under the Alabama Constitution, Ivey was not eligible to seek reelection to a third term as state treasurer in 2010. Her name surfaced in press speculation about gubernatorial candidates in 2010.

In 2009, Ivey announced her candidacy for the Republican nomination for governor in the 2010 elections, joining a crowded field of seven Republican candidates. In March 2010, Ivey abandoned her run for governor and qualified to run for lieutenant governor. She ran against State Senator Hank Erwin of Montevallo and schoolteacher Gene Ponder of Baldwin County for the Republican nomination. In the June 2010 primary election, Ivey won the nomination with 56.6% of the vote, to Erwin's 31.4% and Ponder's 12%.

In the November 2010 elections, in a Republican sweep of statewide offices, Ivey defeated Democratic incumbent Lieutenant Governor Jim Folsom Jr., who had sought an unprecedented fourth term. Ivey received 764,112 votes to Folsom's 718,636.

In 2014, Ivey was challenged in the Republican primary by pastor Stan Cooke of Jefferson County. Ivey received the support of major lobbying groups, such as the Business Council of Alabama, Alabama Retail Association, Alabama Farmers Federation, and Alabama Forestry Association. Ivey defeated Cooke in the primary, with 257,588 votes (61.68%) to Cooke's 160,023 (38.32%). In the general election, Ivey faced Democratic nominee James C. Fields, a former state legislator. In November 2014, Ivey won reelection with 738,090 votes to Fields's 428,007. This marked the first time a Republican was reelected lieutenant governor in the state's history.

Governor of Alabama (2017–present)

Taking office and first months as governor
Ivey was sworn in as governor following the resignation of Robert J. Bentley on April 10, 2017. She is the second female governor in the state's history. The first was Lurleen Wallace, the wife of former governor George Wallace; she was governor for about 16 months in 1967 and 1968, until her death from cancer.

In April 2017, Ivey signed a bill into law that barred judges from overruling a jury's recommendation on the death penalty in sentencing in capital murder cases. Previously Alabama had been the only state with a "judicial override" that allowed a judge to sentence a defendant to death when a jury had recommended a sentence of life without parole. Before the bill was passed, Alabama's capital sentencing scheme was viewed as likely to be struck down as unconstitutional by the U.S. Supreme Court.

In May 2017, Ivey signed into law:
 a bill to speed up death penalty appeals and hasten executions in Alabama.
 a bill barring the removal of any monuments on public display, or the renaming of any public street or building, that had existed for 40 years or more—effectively protecting the state's Confederate monuments.
 a bill banning crossover voting (the practice of casting a ballot in one party's primary election and then casting a ballot in other party's runoff elections).
 a bill allowing faith-based adoption agencies to refuse to place children with gay couples. This bill was criticized by the Human Rights Campaign.

In September 2017, Ivey announced that she was running for election to a full term in the 2018 gubernatorial election.

Roy Moore and the 2017 special election for U.S. Senate
Former U.S. Senator Jeff Sessions (R-AL) resigned from that office in February 2017 to serve as U.S. Attorney General, whereupon then-Governor Bentley chose Luther Strange to succeed Sessions in the Senate until a special election, which Bentley controversially scheduled to align with the 2018 general election instead of sooner. When Ivey succeeded Bentley, she rescheduled the special election for December 12, 2017.

After former Alabama Chief Justice Roy Moore won the Republican nomination for that U.S. Senate seat, The Washington Post published an article revealing allegations of sexual abuse against minors by Moore, which caused many Republican voters and groups in Alabama to withdraw their support for him. There began to be discussion as to whether Ivey would delay the election to allow the Republicans to field an alternative candidate. Ivey subsequently said: "The election date is set for December 12. Were [Strange] to resign I would simply appoint somebody to fill the remaining time until we have the election on December 12." Ivey stated on November 17 that although she had no reason to disbelieve the allegations, she intended to vote for Moore to protect the Republican majority in the U.S. Senate, a statement for which she was criticized. Moore lost the special election to former U.S. Attorney and Democratic nominee Doug Jones. On December 28 Ivey and Alabama Secretary of State John Merrill certified the senatorial election result despite an attempt by the Moore campaign to delay certification over unsubstantiated accusations of voter fraud.

Economic policy 
On April 6, 2018, Ivey signed a bill exempting economic development professionals from registering as lobbyists under the Alabama ethics law. The bill was sponsored by Ken Johnson and would have died if not signed by Ivey over the weekend. Ivey said the legislation would allow the state "to remain on a level playing field with other states, as we compete for job creating capital investments" and Alabama's ability to attract highly sought-after economic development projects would allow the state to continue experiencing "record-low unemployment". On April 9, Ivey signed a bill extending the reach of the Simplified Sellers Use Tax to capture purchases from third-party vendors selling products through Amazon and other online marketplaces. In a press release, Ivey said the legislation would "help bring about a competitive balance between brick-and-mortar retailers in Alabama and third-party online sellers, while streamlining the collection of use taxes that are currently due on online transactions." In a June letter to United States Secretary of Commerce Wilbur Ross, Ivey wrote that she opposed "any efforts that may harm those companies that employ thousands of Alabamians and contribute billions to our economy" and advocated for Ross to "not recommend to President Trump the levying of trade tariffs on automobiles and automotive parts." In August, Ivey named Kelly Butler as Alabama acting finance director, saying that Butler would serve until the completion of a search for a permanent director and would "do an excellent job leading the Alabama Department of Finance during this interim period."

Education policy 
In October 2018, Ivey announced her intent to form an advisory council with the purpose of studying ways to improve science, technology, engineering and math instruction in schools to meet an expectation of strong job demands over the following decade. Ivey said that STEM-related jobs were expected to grow faster than most other forms of employment while paying a median wage roughly twice as large as jobs in other fields and that the Governor's Advisory Council for Excellence in STEM would include educators and representatives of government, business and industry who would give her a comprehensive report on the matter by the end of the year.

LGBT rights
In May 2017, Ivey signed House Bill 24, which would permit religious agencies to refuse to place an adopted child in an LGBTQ family.

In April 2021, Ivey signed a bill banning trans girls from competing in women's sports in Alabama. The bill, HB 391, sponsored by Representative Scott Stadthagen, bans K-12 sports teams from participating in trans-inclusive athletic events. It passed the Alabama House 74-19 and the Alabama Senate 25-5.

In April 2022, Ivey signed two bills related to transgender issues into law. One bans doctors from providing gender-affirming medical care to anyone under 19 and would subject doctors to 10 years in prison and a fine of up to $15,000 for providing such treatments. In a statement, Ivey said, "There are very real challenges facing our young people, especially with today’s societal pressures and modern culture" and "I believe very strongly that if the Good Lord made you a boy, you are a boy, and if he made you a girl, you are a girl." The other law requires students to use the bathrooms of their birth sex. The bill was amended in the Senate to prevent discussions of sexual orientation or gender identity in kindergarten through fifth grade, modeled after Florida's Parental Rights in Education Act.

Firearm policy 
In May 2018, Ivey signed a memo authorizing Alabama school administrators to have guns at schools if they qualified under the Alabama Sentry Program, and thereby be granted permission to "use lethal force to defend the students, faculty, staff, and visitors of his or her school from the threat of imminent bodily harm or death by an armed intruder." In her announcement of the policy, she said, "With the unfortunate continuance of occurrence of school violence in our schools across the nation, we simply cannot afford to wait until the next legislative session." The proposal was criticized by members of both parties, with Republican Mayor of Huntsville Tommy Battle dismissing it as a "one size fits all" plan and Democratic Mayor of Tuscaloosa Walt Maddox suggesting that the program was flawed.

In March 2022, Ivey signed into law House Bill 272, known as constitutional carry. It eliminates the legal requirement to obtain a permit to concealed carry handguns. Ivey said, "Unlike states who are doing everything in their power to make it harder for law-abiding citizens, Alabama is reaffirming our commitment to defending our Second Amendment rights", and "I have always stood up for the rights of law-abiding gun owners, and I am proud to do that again today."

Abortion 
In August 2018, after the 11th Circuit Court of Appeals issued a ruling that blocked the Alabama Unborn Child Protection from Dismemberment Act, Ivey reflected on her support for the state law while serving as lieutenant governor and said, "we should not let this discourage our steadfast commitment to protect the lives of the unborn, even if that means taking this case to the U.S. Supreme Court." She added that the ruling "clearly demonstrates why we need conservative justices on the Supreme Court" and expressed her support for the confirmation of Justice Brett Kavanaugh. The United States Supreme Court declined to hear an appeal of the 11th Circuit Court's ruling. The American Civil Liberties Union represented those opposing appeal. ACLU attorney Andrew Beck said, "While we are pleased to see the end of this particular case, we know that it is nowhere near the end of efforts to undermine access to abortion." 

On May 15, 2019, Ivey signed the even more restrictive House Bill 314, which intended to criminalize abortion as of November 2019 except in cases where the mother's life is threatened or the fetus may not survive. It mandated prison sentences of up to 99 years for physicians performing such surgery. The bill intentionally contradicts the U.S. Supreme Court's ruling in Roe v. Wade that laws banning abortion before fetal viability are unconstitutional, and is expected to be challenged in court. The legislation has also gained notoriety for not allowing exceptions in cases of rape or incest. On October 29, shortly before the law was to take effect, a federal judge blocked the statute. Ivey and Alabama Attorney General Steve Marshall said they expected the Supreme Court would overturn the ruling on appeal.

Health care policy 
In March 2018, Ivey announced that Alabama would seek permission to put work or job-training requirements on the Medicaid benefits for roughly 75,000 able-bodied adults whose incomes were just a few hundred dollars a month. She asserted that the work requirements would "save taxpayer dollars and will reserve Medicaid services for those that are truly in need of assistance."
In September, Ivey said that everyone wanted "high-quality medicine at an affordable cost available to everybody" but that enacting the policy would require figuring out how to pay for it.

On October 1, Ivey announced that the federal government had approved a new care-management program in Alabama to complement and enhance the state's current system of long-term care services provided to approximately 23,000 Alabama Medicaid recipients. She called the approval "a significant step in our efforts to transform the delivery of services to Medicaid recipients" and said it was her goal "to ensure that all Alabamians receive high-quality health care, no matter their economic status."

Ivey opposes Medicaid expansion, saying in 2018 that it was "not an issue we can tackle at this point."

During the COVID-19 pandemic, Ivey declared a state of emergency on March 13, 2020. She was reluctant to issue a stay-at-home order. On March 28, Lieutenant Governor Ainsworth wrote an open letter criticizing Ivey's actions in regard to the pandemic as inadequate. Ivey issued a stay-at-home order on April 3 to take effect the following day. In May 2021, Ivey prohibited businesses and public institutions in Alabama from requiring people to show proof of vaccination against COVID-19 to access facilities and services. In July 2021, she pleaded with Alabamians to get vaccinated, blaming the unvaccinated for the continued spread of the disease. In September 2021, she signed a bill into law that used COVID-19 relief funds to build new prisons in Alabama. In October 2021, she ordered state agencies in Alabama to refuse to comply with federal vaccine requirements.

Environmental policy 
In October 2018, Ivey appointed Ruby L. Perry and Kevin McKinstry to the Alabama Environmental Management Commission.

Reelection campaign 
In June 2021, Ivey's office announced her decision to run for a second full term as governor. Ivey drew 14 challengers by the time the candidate qualification period closed. Eight of those running against her were doing so in the Republican primary.

During her campaign, Ivey released an ad titled "Stole" that falsely claimed that the 2020 presidential election had been stolen from Donald Trump. Ivey won the Republican primary and was reelected in the general election with 67.4% of the vote.

Communications transparency 
Shortly after being inaugurated for her second full term as governor in January 2023, Ivey signed an executive order aiming to promote transparency in state government by requiring agencies to respond to public records requests. The same month, the Alabama Department of Transportation acquired an emergency order to prevent the release of communications between its director, John Cooper, and Ivey's office. This came amid a lawsuit between the agency and the Baldwin County Bridge Company; Cooper sought to withhold these records from the Montgomery County Circuit Court, and cited "executive privilege" in doing so. Ivey signed an amicus curiae filing in support of Cooper's efforts to suppress the release of the communication records with her office. The signing occurred less than a week after the enactment of the transparency executive order.

Personal life
Ivey has been married and divorced twice, and has no children. Her first marriage was to Ben LaRavia; they became engaged while studying at Auburn University. Ivey is a member of First Baptist Church in Montgomery.

In 2019, Ivey was diagnosed with lung cancer. She received an outpatient treatment at the University of Alabama at Birmingham on September 20, 2019. She said, "I am confident of God’s plan and purpose for my life." Ivey was declared cancer-free in January 2020. The cancer was Stage I and responded well to radiation treatment.

Electoral history

See also 
 List of female governors in the United States
 List of female lieutenant governors in the United States

References

Further reading
 Wilson, Claire. "Kay Ivey" Encyclopedia of Alabama (2020) online

External links

Governor of Alabama official government site
Kay Ivey for Lt. Governor  official campaign site

Biography  at the Alabama Department of Archives and History

|-

|-

|-

|-

|-

|-

1944 births
20th-century American politicians
20th-century American women politicians
21st-century American politicians
21st-century American women politicians
Alabama Democrats
Alabama Republicans
Auburn University alumni
Baptists from Alabama
Governors of Alabama
Lieutenant Governors of Alabama
Living people
People from Camden, Alabama
Republican Party governors of Alabama
State treasurers of Alabama
Women state governors of the United States
Schoolteachers from California
American women educators
Women state constitutional officers of Alabama